Northern Spy Records is a record label in Brooklyn, New York that specializes in avant-garde music, noise rock, and experimental jazz. The label was founded by Tom Abbs and Adam Downey in 2010 after working for ESP-Disk.

History
Northern Spy is an artist-run record label. In October 2011, Northern Spy produced the first annual Spy Music Festival, spanning two days and hosted by two venues. The festival was hailed as a celebration of the label's first birthday. A year later, the label threw its second festival, which took place over two weeks in venues throughout Brooklyn and Manhattan. NSPY artists continue to support local venues by bringing their devoted fans together in small DIY venues.

Northern Spy and its management has been featured in the press through interviews, blogs and in newspapers. The Village Voice published an extensive interview with Downey and Abbs in September 2011. In July 2011, East Village Radio named Northern Spy one of the four most important independent record labels in New York City.

Northern Spy also owns the NNA Tapes record label.  It is closely affiliated with the Clandestine Label Services management firm and with the Birdwatcher record label and recording studio firm.

Artists

 Aa (Big A Little a)
 Angels in America
 Arnold Dreyblatt & Megafaun
 Arto Lindsay
 Bird Names
 Charles Gayle
 Chicago Underground Duo
 Chris Forsyth
 Cloud Becomes Your Hand
 Colin L. Orchestra
 Colin Langenus
 Cuddle Magic
 Dan Melchior
 Diamond Terrifier
 Donovan Quinn
 Eleven Twenty-Nine
 Eugene Chadbourne
 Extra Life
 Foot Village
 Gary Lucas
 Gerald Cleaver's Black Host
 Haunted House
 Horse Lords
 Hubble
 Jenks Miller
 John Butcher
 Loren Connors and Suzanne Langille
 Marc Ribot's Ceramic Dog
 Mystical Weapons
 Neptune
 NYMPH
 PC Worship
 Renata Zeiguer
 Rhys Chatham
 Seaven Teares
 Shilpa Ray
 Starring
 The Home of Easy Credit
 The Necks
 The Spanish Donkey
 The USA Is a Monster
 Thurston Moore & Loren Connors
 Wume
 Zs

Discography

See also
List of independent record labels

References

External links
 Official site

 
Jazz record labels
Mass media companies based in New York City
New York (state) record labels
Record labels established in 2010